Constantine Komnenos (– after 1147) was a Byzantine aristocrat and nephew of Emperor Alexios I Komnenos. Promoted to the rank of sebastos, he served as doux of Beroea in 1107, and later as megas droungarios. He married a lady from the Antiochos and Euphorbenos clans.

References

Sources
 
 

1080s births
12th-century deaths
11th-century Byzantine people
12th-century Byzantine people
Byzantine governors
Constantine
Officials of Alexios I Komnenos
Sebastoi
Year of birth uncertain
Year of death unknown